Constable of Castile was a title of a military nature created by John I, King of Castile in 1382, as a result of the Third Fernandine War against the Portuguese and the English.
 
The post substituted the title of Alférez Mayor del Reino and was more consistent with that of the French Constable of France. The constable was the second person in power in the kingdom, after the King and had supreme authority over the Army, as well as broad jurisdictional powers.

In 1473, Henry IV of Castile made the title hereditary for the Velasco family and the dukes of Frías. By that time, the position lacked any substance, and therefore it was decided that the title would cease to have any military or administrative connotations, and was simply an honorific title.

List of constables of Castile
 1382 - 1391 : Alfonso of Aragon and Foix
 1393 - 1400 : Pedro Enrique de Trastámara, son of Fadrique Alfonso of Castile
 1400 - 1423 : Ruy López Dávalos
 1423 - 1453 : Álvaro de Luna
 1458 - 1473 : Miguel Lucas de Iranzo

Hereditary ceremonial title 
 1473 - 1492 : Pedro Fernández de Velasco, 2nd Count of Haro
 1492 - 1512 : Bernardino Fernández de Velasco, 1st Duke of Frías
 1512 - 1528 : Íñigo Fernández de Velasco, 2nd Duke of Frías
 1528 - 1559 : Pedro Fernández de Velasco, 3rd Duke of Frías 
 1559 - 1585 : Íñigo Fernández de Velasco, 4th Duke of Frías  
 1585 - 1615 : Juan Fernández de Velasco, 5th Duke of Frías 
 1615 - 1652 : Bernardino Fernández de Velasco, 6th Duke of Frías 
 1652 - 1696 : Íñigo Melchor de Velasco, 7th Duke of Frías 
 1696 - 1713 : José Fernández de Velasco y Tovar, 8th Duke of Frías

Sources 
Portal de Archivos Españoles

Spanish noble titles
Spanish Army
Military history of Spain
1382 establishments in Europe
14th-century establishments in Castile